Kenneth J. Green (born July 23, 1958) is an American professional golfer who has played on the PGA Tour, the Nationwide Tour and the PGA Tour Champions.  Green has won eleven tournaments as a pro, including five PGA Tour events and played on the U.S. team in the 1989 Ryder Cup. He is also known for returning to competition after losing his right leg in a 2009 RV accident.

Early years
Green was born in Danbury, Connecticut.  He started playing golf at age 12 in Honduras, where his father, Martin "Marty" Green, was principal of the American school, and his only choices of sports were golf or soccer.  He quit school at 16 to pursue his dream of becoming a professional tour player. He received his GED in  Dec. 1976.

College career
He later attended Palm Beach Junior College in Lake Worth, Florida for a year.  He then accepted an athletic scholarship to attend the University of Florida in Gainesville, Florida, where he played for coach Buster Bishop and coach John Darr's Florida Gators men's golf team in National Collegiate Athletic Association (NCAA) competition from 1977 to 1979.  Green was a second-team All-Southeastern Conference (SEC) selection in 1979.

Professional career
Green turned pro in 1979 and joined the PGA Tour in 1980.  He had five tournament victories on the PGA Tour; all five came in the mid to late 1980s.  His first win came in 1985 at the Buick Open, and his last was at the Kmart Greater Greensboro Open in 1989.  His best year in professional golf was 1988, when he won two events on the PGA Tour, as well as the Dunlop Phoenix in Japan.  His best finish in a major was a seventh-place tie at the 1996 U.S. Open.  Green also played on the U.S. team in the 1989 Ryder Cup.

During his time in professional golf, Green has had a reputation for rebelliousness and a propensity to pull stunts.  He has had over two dozen fines levied by the PGA Tour for his bad boy antics.  Some of his antics included sneaking friends into The Masters in the trunk of his car, drinking beer on the course while playing with Arnold Palmer at the 1997 Masters, and hitting golf balls through narrow openings in sliding-glass doors.  Other fines were for more mundane offenses like swearing on the course, criticizing officials, and signing autographs while playing.  His personal problems—divorces, gambling, clinical depression—led to near financial ruin, and affected his playing time and the quality of his play.  In his 40s, Green had difficulty maintaining his PGA Tour playing privileges and was forced to play some on the Nationwide Tour.

He has sometimes played tournament rounds dressed in green from head to toe, shoes included.

Green had 508 career starts on the PGA Tour, the last coming in 2006. He continues to compete in a limited number of Champions Tour events. In 2022, he was one of the participants in the inaugural U.S. Adaptive Open, a tournament for those with various impairments, held at Pinehurst Resort's No. 6 Course.

Personal life
Green lives in West Palm Beach, Florida.  He is the father of two sons, Ken Jr. and Hunter.  He is an avid bowler who once rolled a 300 game.

In 2003, Green was reported to have jumped into a canal in Palm Beach County, Florida to save his German Shepherd dog, Nip, from the jaws of an alligator.

In June 2009, Green was seriously injured in a motor vehicle accident when his motor home left the road. Green was in his recreational vehicle traveling on Interstate 20 near Meridian, Mississippi, when the right front tire blew, causing the vehicle to veer off the road and go down a deep embankment before hitting a tree. The accident killed the passengers: William Green, his brother; Jeanne Hodgin, his girlfriend; and his dog, Nip. Even though his lower right leg was amputated as a result of injuries suffered in the accident, Green vowed to return to competitive golf.

Green's estranged son Hunter died of a drug overdose in Dallas, Texas on January 22, 2010.

In June 2019, Green released a self-published autobiography titled "Hunter of Hope: A Life Lived Inside, Outside and On the Ropes." In it, he revisits his life as a teen in Guatemala, where, because of his alcoholic father's negligence, he was suffered years of sexual abuse by his father's friends. The golf course was a refuge from this abuse. He explains one reason for the book: "My plan has been simple: Use the adversity as my purpose and reason to live."

Amateur wins
this list may be incomplete
1978 Azalea Invitational

Professional wins (11)

PGA Tour wins (5)

PGA Tour playoff record (0–2)

Japan Golf Tour wins (1)

Asia Golf Circuit wins (1)

*Note: The 1990 Hong Kong Open was shortened to 54 holes due to rain.

Other wins (4)
1985 Hassan II Golf Trophy, Connecticut Open
1987 Spalding Invitational
1992 Connecticut Open

Results in major championships

CUT = missed the half-way cut
WD = withdrew
"T" = tied

Summary

Most consecutive cuts made – 3 (1989 Masters – 1989 Open Championship)
Longest streak of top-10s – 1

Results in The Players Championship

CUT = missed the halfway cut
DQ = disqualified
"T" indicates a tie for a place

U.S. national team appearances
Four Tours World Championship: 1989 (winners)
Ryder Cup: 1989 (tied)

See also

Fall 1981 PGA Tour Qualifying School graduates
1982 PGA Tour Qualifying School graduates
1984 PGA Tour Qualifying School graduates
2002 PGA Tour Qualifying School graduates
List of American Ryder Cup golfers
List of Florida Gators men's golfers on the PGA Tour

References

External links

Pro golfer Ken Green trying to recover from three harrowing losses — his girlfriend, his brother and his lower right leg
Video of Green on the comeback trail

American male golfers
Florida Gators men's golfers
PGA Tour golfers
PGA Tour Champions golfers
Ryder Cup competitors for the United States
Golfers from Connecticut
Golfers from Florida
Palm Beach State College alumni
American amputees
Sportspeople from Danbury, Connecticut
Sportspeople from West Palm Beach, Florida
1958 births
Living people